Donald Herbert Davidson (March 6, 1917 – August 30, 2003) was an American philosopher. He served as Slusser Professor of Philosophy at the University of California, Berkeley, from 1981 to 2003 after having also held teaching appointments at Stanford University, Rockefeller University, Princeton University, and the University of Chicago. Davidson was known for his charismatic personality and the depth and difficulty of his thought. His work exerted considerable influence in many areas of philosophy from the 1960s onward, particularly in philosophy of mind, philosophy of language, and action theory. While Davidson was an analytic philosopher, and most of his influence lies in that tradition, his work has attracted attention in continental philosophy as well, particularly in literary theory and related areas.

Personal life
Davidson was married three times. His first wife was the artist Virginia Davidson, with whom he had his only child, a daughter, Elizabeth (Davidson) Boyer. Following his divorce from Virginia Davidson, he married for the second time to Nancy Hirschberg, Professor of Psychology at the University of Illinois at Urbana-Champaign and later at Chicago Circle. She died in 1979. In 1984, Davidson married for the third and last time, to philosopher Marcia Cavell.

Swampman

Swampman is the subject of a philosophical thought experiment introduced by Donald Davidson in his 1987 paper "Knowing One's Own Mind". In the experiment, Davidson is struck by lightning in a swamp and disintegrated; simultaneously, an exact copy of Davidson, the Swampman, is made from a nearby tree and proceeds through life exactly as Davidson would have, indistinguishable from Davidson. The experiment is used by Davidson to claim that thought and meaning cannot exist in a vacuum; they are dependent on their interconnections to the world. Therefore, despite being physically identical to himself, Davidson states that the Swampman does not have thoughts nor meaningful language, as it has no causal history to base them on.

The experiment runs as follows:

Awards
Jean Nicod Prize (1995)

Bibliography
 Decision-Making: An Experimental Approach, co-authored with Patrick Suppes and Sidney Siegel. Stanford: Stanford University Press. 1957.
 "Actions, Reasons, and Causes," Journal of Philosophy, 60, 1963. (Reprinted in Davidson, 2001a.)
 "Truth and Meaning," Synthese, 17, 1967. (Reprinted in Davidson, 2001b.)
 "Mental Events," in Experience and Theory, Foster and Swanson (eds.). London: Duckworth. 1970. (Reprinted in Davidson, 2001a).
 "Agency," in Agent, Action, and Reason, Binkley, Bronaugh, and Marras (eds.), Toronto: University of Toronto Press. 1971. (Reprinted in Davidson, 2001a.)
 "Radical Interpretation," Dialectica, 27, 1973, 313–328. (Reprinted in Davidson, 2001b.)
 Semantics of Natural Languages, Davidson, Donald and Gilbert Harman (eds.), 2nd ed. New York: Springer. 1973.
 Plato's ‘Philebus’, New York: Garland Publishing. 1990.
 Essays on Actions and Events, 2nd ed. Oxford: Oxford University Press. 2001a.
 Inquiries into Truth and Interpretation, 2nd ed. Oxford: Oxford University Press. 2001b.
 Subjective, Intersubjective, Objective. Oxford: Oxford University Press. 2001c.
 Problems of Rationality, Oxford: Oxford University Press. 2004.
 Truth, Language, and History: Philosophical Essays, Oxford: Oxford University Press. 2005.
 Truth and Predication.  Cambridge, Mass.: Harvard University Press. 2005. 
 The Essential Davidson. Oxford: Oxford University Press. 2006.

Filmography
 Rudolf Fara (host), In conversation: Donald Davidson (19 videocassettes), Philosophy International, Centre for Philosophy of the Natural and Social Sciences, London School of Economics, 1997.

See also
 List of Jean Nicod Prize laureates
 List of American philosophers
 Swamp Thing

Notes

References

Further reading
 Dasenbrock, Reed Way (ed.). Literary Theory After Davidson. University Park: Pennsylvania University Press. 1993.
 Hahn, Lewis Edwin (ed.).  The Philosophy of Donald Davidson, Library of Living Philosophers XXVII. Chicago: Open Court. 1999.
 Kotatko, Petr, Peter Pagin and Gabriel Segal (eds.). Interpreting Davidson. Stanford: CSLI Publications. 2001.
 Evnine, Simon. Donald Davidson. Stanford: Stanford University Press. 1991.
 Kalugin, Vladimir. "Donald Davidson (1917–2003)," Internet Encyclopedia of Philosophy, 2006. (link)
 Lepore, Ernest and Brian McLaughlin (eds.). Actions and Events: Perspectives on the Philosophy of Donald Davidson. Oxford: Basil Blackwell. 1985.
 Lepore, Ernest (ed.). Truth and Interpretation: Perspectives on the Philosophy of Donald Davidson. Oxford: Basil Blackwell. 1986.
 Lepore, Ernest and Kirk Ludwig. "Donald Davidson," Midwest Studies in Philosophy, September 2004, vol. 28, pp. 309–333.
 Lepore, Ernest and Kirk Ludwig. Donald Davidson: Meaning, Truth, Language and Reality. Oxford: Oxford University Press. 2005.
 Lepore, Ernest and Kirk Ludwig. Donald Davidson's Truth-Theoretic Semantics. Oxford: Oxford University Press. 2007.
 Ludwig, Kirk (ed.). Donald Davidson. Cambridge: Cambridge University Press. 2003.
 Ludwig, Kirk. "Donald Davidson: Essays on Actions and Events." In Classics of Western Philosophy: The Twentieth Century: Quine and After, vol. 5., John Shand (ed.), Acumen Press, 2006, pp. 146–165.
 Malpas, Jeffrey. Donald Davidson and the Mirror of Meaning: Holism, Truth, Interpretation. Cambridge: Cambridge University Press. 1992.
 Mou, Bo (ed.). Davidson's Philosophy and Chinese Philosophy: Constructive Engagement. Leiden & Boston: Brill. 2006.
 Preyer, Gerhard, Frank Siebelt, and Alexander Ulfig (eds.). Language, Mind and Epistemology: On Donald Davidson's Philosophy. Dordrecht: Kluwer Academic Publishers. 1994.
 Ramberg, Bjorn. Donald Davidson's Philosophy of Language: An Introduction. Oxford: Basil Blackwell. 1989.
 Romaneczko, Marta E. The Role of Metalanguage in  Radical Interpretation. Journal of Consciousness Studies. 2007.
 Stoecker, Ralf (ed.). Reflecting Davidson. Berlin: W. de Gruyter. 1993.
 Uzunova, Boryana. The ‘World’ of Donald Davidson: Some Remarks on the Concept. in: Philosophia: E-Journal of Philosophy and Culture – 1/2012.
 Vermazen, B., and Hintikka, M. Essays on Davidson: Actions and Events. Oxford: Clarendon Press. 1985.
 Zeglen, Ursula M. (ed.). Donald Davidson: Truth, Meaning and Knowledge. London: Routledge. 1991.

External links

 
 
 "Donald Davidson" – by Jeff Malpas, Stanford Encyclopedia of Philosophy, 2005.
 "Donald Davidson (1917–2003)" by Vladimir Kalugin, Internet Encyclopedia of Philosophy, 2006.
 Guide to the Donald Davidson Papers at The Bancroft Library

1917 births
2003 deaths
20th-century American non-fiction writers
20th-century American philosophers
20th-century essayists
21st-century American non-fiction writers
21st-century American philosophers
21st-century essayists
Action theorists
American logicians
American male essayists
American male non-fiction writers
American philosophy academics
Analytic philosophers
Epistemologists
Harvard University alumni
Jean Nicod Prize laureates
Logicians
Metaphysicians
Ontologists
People from Springfield, Massachusetts
People from Staten Island
Philosophers of art
Philosophers of language
Philosophers of logic
Philosophers of mind
Philosophers of psychology
Philosophers of social science
Philosophy writers
Princeton University faculty
Rockefeller University faculty
Stanford University Department of Philosophy faculty
University of California, Berkeley College of Letters and Science faculty
University of Chicago faculty
20th-century American male writers
21st-century American male writers